Dmytro Ostapenko (ukr. Дмито Іванович Остапенко, born November 3, 1946) is a Ukrainian statesman and cultural figure. Minister of Culture and Arts of Ukraine (1995-1999), Director of the National Philharmonic of Ukraine.

Biography 
Dmytro Ostapenko was born in Novachykha village, Poltava region. In 1968 was graduated from Kharkiv institute of Arts.

From 1973 to 1977 he worked in the Kharkiv regional committee of the Young Communist League and the city committee of the Communist Party of Ukraine.

From 1977 to 1982 - Director of the Kharkiv Academic Opera and Ballet Theater.

From 1982 to 1984 - Head of the Department of Theaters and Music Institutions of the Ministry of Culture of the USSR.

From 1984 to 1991 - Instructor in the Central Committee of the Communist Party of Ukraine.

From 1991 to 1992 - Head of the Department of Culture of the Institute of Scientific Innovations of the Ukrainian Branch of the International Center for Scientific Culture "World Laboratory".

From 1992 to 1995 - Director of the National Philharmonic of Ukraine.

From September 25, 1995, to August 4, 1999 - Minister of Culture and Arts of Ukraine.

Since 1999 - Director of the National Philharmonic of Ukraine.

References

Links 

Culture ministers of Ukraine
1946 births
Living people
People from Poltava Oblast